Dorot (lit. Generations) is a kibbutz in southern Israel. Located on Route 334 near Sderot, it falls under the municipal jurisdiction of the Sha'ar HaNegev Regional Council.

History
Dorot was established during Hanukkah in 1941 by Jewish refugees from Germany, who farmed grain, fruit trees, and vegetables. Soil erosion was a particular problem for the kibbutz. It was named after three members of the Hoz family, Dov, Rivka and Tirtza, who had died in a car accident the year before. The founders were later joined by native Israelis and immigrants from Czechoslovakia and Latvia. In 1947 it had a population of 300.

In the summer of 1946, Dorot and the neighbouring village of Ruhama were occupied by the British army. In their search for illicit arms in the village, the British troops inflicted considerable material damage on the village.
During the 1948 Arab-Israeli war, and the battle for the Negev, Dorot was cut off and had to be supplied by air until it was liberated in October 1948.

After 1948, Dorot expanded on the land of the Palestinian Arab village of Huj, which was depopulated during the 1948 Arab–Israeli War.

The Jewish National Fund established a forest on the settlement's land called the Pioneer Women's Forest, funded by donor contributions from the United States.

Notable people
Eliyahu Moyal, Knesset member

Historic photos

References

External links
Kibbutz website 

1941 establishments in Mandatory Palestine
Czech-Jewish culture in Israel
Gaza envelope
German-Jewish culture in Israel
Jewish villages in Mandatory Palestine
Kibbutzim
Kibbutz Movement
Latvian-Jewish culture in Israel
Populated places established in 1941
Populated places in Southern District (Israel)
Slovak-Jewish culture in Israel